Marcus Fernaldi Gideon (born 9 March 1991) is an Indonesian badminton player who was formerly ranked world No. 1 in the men's doubles by the Badminton World Federation. He plays for PB Jaya Raya, and has been a member of the club since June 2018. He won the 2017 All England Open with his current partner Kevin Sanjaya Sukamuljo. He and Sukamuljo were recognized as one of the most outstanding players, and awarded as the BWF Best Male Players of the Year for two years in a row after collecting seven Superseries titles in 2017 and eight World Tour titles in 2018.

Gideon and Sukamuljo are often referred to as "the Minions" because of their below average height and for their fast and agile playing style, jumping and bouncing just like the Minions in the film Despicable Me. Gillian Clark, a BWF commentator, stated that the fast play shown by Gideon and Sukamuljo have taken the men's doubles game to a new level and makes the matches more exciting to watch.

Career

Early life 
Gideon started his career in badminton at the Tangkas Jakarta club when he was 9 years old. At the age of 13, he began playing professionally, and at the same time, he received a scholarship in Singapore. Four months later in Singapore, he returned to Indonesia because of illness, and decided not to continue his education abroad. He was again trained by his father, as a singles and doubles player. Gideon won his first international title in the men's singles discipline at the Victorian International a Future Series event.

2010–2014: Independent player, first Superseries title 
Gideon was selected to join the national training centre in Cipayung, in the men's doubles team in 2010. Partnered with Agripina Prima Rahmanto Putra, he won the 2011 Singapore and 2012 Iran International tournaments, and also finished as the runners-up in 2012 Vietnam and Osaka International. Feeling disappointed with the Herry Iman Pierngadi decision in the sending players to the international tournaments, Gideon decided to leave the national training centre in 2013.

Gideon then returned to the court as an independent player paired with the Beijing 2008 gold medalist, Markis Kido. The duo reached the semifinals at the 2013 Indonesian Masters Grand Prix Gold losing to national players Ronald Alexander and Selvanus Geh in straight games. He captured his first Superseries title at the 2013 French Open with Kido, played from the qualification stage, and beat the seeded pairs in their journey to reach the men's doubles podium. Gideon and Kido, reached the semifinals at the 2014 All England Open, and then won their second title at the 2014 Indonesia Masters defeating Selvanus Geh and Kevin Sanjaya Sukamuljo in the final with the rubber games.

2015–2016: The Minions World number 2 
Seeing his achievements with Markis Kido, Gideon was invited by PBSI to rejoin the national team. In early 2015, he was paired with Kevin Sanjaya Sukamuljo, ending the years by occupying the top 20 BWF World Ranking, grabbing one title at the Chinese Taipei Masters. At the Chinese Taipei Open in July, Gideon and Sukamuljo reached the final by defeating then World Champions Mohammad Ahsan and Hendra Setiawan, but they failed to take the title, losing the final tamely to Fu Haifeng and Zhang Nan. After this tournament, Indonesian badminton fans dub them as "the Minions" because of their below average height and for their fast and agile playing style, jumping and bouncing just like the Minions in the film Despicable Me. The former badminton player who is currently a BWF commentator, Gillian Clark, also highlighted that the fast play shown by Gideon and Sukamuljo have taken the men's doubles game to a new level and makes the matches exciting to watch. Gideon also participated at the Southeast Asian Games, clinched the gold medal in the men's team event and a silver medal in the men's doubles event.

Gideon and Sukamuljo started their 2016 tour by winning the Malaysia Masters, their performance continued to improve and they won the Superseries title in India and Australia, followed by the Superseries Premier title in China. At the end of 2016, he and Sukamuljo reached the top 10 world ranking, and qualified to compete at the BWF Superseries Finals held in Dubai. The duo failed to advance to the knock out stage after standing in the third position in the group stage, having won a match against their compatriots Angga Pratama and Ricky Karanda Suwardi, and losing two matches to Danish and Japanese pairs. Nevertheless, at year's end Gideon and Sukamuljo occupied the number 2 position in the world rankings.

2017: World number 1 

Now competing only in the world's biggest events, Gideon and Sukamuljo began the 2017 by making up for their 2016 first round defeat with a tournament victory at the coveted All England Open in March, thus earning a number one men's doubles world ranking. They then secured their second consecutive India Open title, and after that won the Malaysia Open. Their remarkable winning run was then stopped by Danish veterans Mathias Boe and Carsten Mogensen in the semifinals of the Singapore Open. In May, they played for Indonesia at the Sudirman Cup held in Australia. In group round robin play they won their country's only point in its surprising loss to India but in group play against Denmark they again lost to Boe and Mogensen, as Indonesia, for the first time in the Cup's 28-year history, was eliminated in the group stage of the competition. In June the duo was upset by another Danish pair, Kim Astrup and Anders Skaarup Rasmussen, in the first round of Indonesia Open.

In August, Gideon and Sukamuljo went to the World Championships held in Glasgow, Scotland, as third seeds, but lost in the quarter-finals to China's Chai Biao and Hong Wei in three close games. In September they reached the final of the Korea Open but were again beaten by Boe and Morgensen, however, one week later they exacted a measure of revenge against the Danes in the semi-finals of Japan Open, then went on to win the tournament by defeating the host pair of Takuto Inoue and Yuki Kaneko. In October, Gideon and Sukamuljo lost the final of the Denmark Open in a tight match to reigning World Champion Liu Cheng and Zhang Nan. Citing an arm injury suffered during their semifinal match in Denmark, Gideon withdrew from the next Superseries tournament in France. Back together in November, Gideon and Sukamuljo improved their head-to-head record against Boe and Mogensen to 3–4, after defeating them in the finals and securing their second China Open title. They won the Hong Kong Open a week later, their sixth Superseries victory of the season, thus equaling the previous men's doubles record of six set by South Koreans Lee Yong-dae and Yoo Yeon-seong in 2015. For their achievements Sukamuljo and Gideon were named Best Male Players of the Year by the Badminton World Federation. The duo then closed out the year by capturing the Dubai World Superseries Finals, making them the first men's doubles pair to win seven Superseries titles in a year.

2018: Asian Games gold medalists 
Under the new BWF player commitment regulations, Gideon and Sukamuljo who ranked as world number 1, are obligated to play in 12 BWF World Tour. They were unbeaten in the first 3 tournaments that they participated in, capturing his second Indonesia Masters and All England Open, and also his third India Open titles. He and Gideon then defeated at the quarterfinals of Malaysia Open by Chinese pair He Jiting and Tan Qiang. In July, he and his partner won the Indonesia Open. At the 2018 World Championships, Gideon and Sukamuljo lost in the quarterfinals to Takeshi Kamura and Keigo Sonoda in straight games.

Gideon competed at the 2018 Asian Games, won a silver in the team events, and then captured the men's doubles gold medal, after he and his partner, Sukamuljo, beat their compatriots Fajar Alfian and Muhammad Rian Ardianto in a close rubber games in the final. In September, Gideon and Sukamuljo retained their Japan Open title, defeating the reigning World Champions Li Junhui and Liu Yuchen. A week later, they finished as semifinalists in China Open, lost to Han Chengkai and Zhou Haodong of China. On the Europe tour in October, they clinched the Denmark Open title. But in France, they again defeated by Han and Zhou in the final, made their head-to-head record deficit to 1–2. In November, the duo won the Fuzhou China Open and Hong Kong Open. After the victory they achieved in Hong Kong, Gideon and Sukamuljo managed to set a record as the first ever men's doubles pair to win eight world tour titles in a season. At the 2018 BWF World Tour Finals gala dinner, the duo then awarded as the BWF Best Male Players of the Year for two consecutive year. As the defending champions of the World Tour Finals, they had to withdraw from the competition before their last group match, due to the neck injury suffered by Gideon.

2019: Eight World Tour titles 
Gideon opened the season in January by winning his second Malaysia Masters and third Indonesia Masters titles. Gideon and Sukamuljo reached his record 20th titles at the Superseries/Super 500 above tournaments. They then played at the Asian Championships held in Wuhan, China as first seed, and proceeded to the final, but inflicted a crushing defeat by number 5 seed Hiroyuki Endo and Yuta Watanabe. Gideon then played with Indonesia mixed team at the Nanning Sudirman Cup, where he and his partner, Sukamuljo, have never lost in their three matches against England, Chinese Taipei and Japan, but the team ended their journey in the competition after lost 1–3 in the semifinals tie against Japan. In the second half of the 2019 season, Gideon and Sukamuljo won the Indonesia and Japan Opens in July; China Open in September; Denmark and French Opens in October; and also the Fuzhou China Open in November. Gideon and Sukamuljo were nominated for the Best Male Player award, but failed to retain the award after being defeated by Kento Momota. They entered the World Tour Finals as the first seed. In the group stage, they beat Li Junhui and Liu Yuchen, lost to Endo and Watanabe, and then in the last match, they won against Takeshi Kamura and Keigo Sonoda, progressed to the next round as group runners-up. In the semifinal, they again defeated by the Japanese pair Endo and Watanabe, made their head-to-head record deficit to 2–5. Gideon ended the 2019 season by winning eight World Tour titles, including three in a row at Denmark, France and China.

2020–2021: The Thomas Cup: World men's team champions 
Gideon and his partner, Sukamuljo started the 2020 season by playing in the Malaysia Masters. However, they finished in the quarter finals after losing to Fajar Alfian and Muhammad Rian Ardianto in a close rubber game. Gideon later won his fourth Indonesia Masters title (third with Sukamuljo)  by defeating Mohammad Ahsan and Hendra Setiawan in straight games in the final. In February, he alongside Indonesia men's team won the Asia Team Championships held in Manila. In March, they played at the All England Open. The duo failed to win the title after lost to Hiroyuki Endo and Yuta Watanabe in the final. This was their sixth loss in a row over Endo and Watanabe. Due to the COVID-19 pandemic, numerous tournaments on the 2020 BWF World Tour were either cancelled or rescheduled for later in the year. Gideon and Sukamuljo planned to return in the international competitions at the 2020 Asian Leg tournament in January 2021, but then they had to withdraw from the competition after his partner, Sukamuljo, tested positive for COVID-19 in December 2020.

Gideon made his comeback at the All England Open in March 2021. He and Sukamuljo had played in the first round by beating the host pair Matthew Clare and Ethan van Leeuwen in a rubber game, but later Indonesia team were forced to withdraw from the competition by BWF after the team members will self-isolate for 10 days from the date of their inbound flight after an anonym person traveling onboard tested positive for COVID-19. In July 2021, Gideon competed at the 2020 Summer Olympics partnering Sukamuljo as first seed. The duo led the group standings after won two matches and lost a match. Gideon and Sukamuljo were eliminated from the competition by Malaysian pair Aaron Chia and Soh Wooi Yik in the quarter-finals.

In September–October, Gideon alongside Indonesia team competed at the 2021 Sudirman Cup in Vantaa, Finland. The team advanced to the knocked-out stage, but stopped in the quarter-finals to Malaysia. In the next tournament in Aarhus, Denmark, he helped Indonesia team reached the final of the World Men's Team Championships, and the team won the 2020 Thomas Cup. In the next tournament, Gideon and Sukamuljo played at the BWF World Tour in Denmark, French, and Hylo Opens. The duo ended the tour by winning the Hylo Open. At the Indonesia badminton festival, they finished as runner-up in the Indonesia Masters and triumph in the Indonesia Open. This was their three successive victory at the Indonesia Open following on from success in 2018 and 2019. Their achievements in 2021, lead them as the first seed in the BWF World Tour Finals. The duo reached the final, but lost a well contested match to Japan's Takuro Hoki and Yugo Kobayashi in a close rubber games.

2022 
In 2022, Gideon and his partner, Sukamuljo, started the BWF tour in the All England Open. Unfortunately, they were stopped in the semi-finals by the young compatriot, the eventual champions, Muhammad Shohibul Fikri and Bagas Maulana. In April, Gideon flew to Porto, Portugal underwent surgery to remove pieces of bone on his ankles performed by surgeon Niek van Dijk. Even though he has not fully recovered, Gideon returned to the tournament court in June, to compete in the Indonesia Masters and Open. At that tournament, Gideon and Sukamuljo finished as semi-finalists in the Indonesia Masters, and stopped in the second round in the Indonesia Open. They then stepped on podium in October as runner-up of the Denmark Open, losing the final to Fajar Alfian and Muhammad Rian Ardianto.

2023 
Gideon and his partner, Sukamuljo, started the BWF tour in the Malaysia Open. Unfortunately, they were stopped in the second round by Chinese pair, Liang Weikeng and Wang Chang. In the next tournament, they lost again by Liang and Wang in the quarter-finals of the India Open. They competed at the home tournament, Indonesia Masters, but retired in the second round from Chinese pair Liu Yuchen and Ou Xuanyi following the injured of Gideon.

Personal life 
Gideon is the son of former national badminton player, Kurniahu. He married a general practitioner, Agnes Amelinda Mulyadi on 14 April 2018. His first son Marcus Fernaldi Gideon Jr. was born in January 2019.

Awards and nominations

Achievements

Asian Games 

Men's doubles

Asian Championships 
Men's doubles

Southeast Asian Games 
Men's doubles

BWF World Tour (19 titles, 6 runners-up) 
The BWF World Tour, which was announced on 19 March 2017 and implemented in 2018, is a series of elite badminton tournaments sanctioned by the Badminton World Federation (BWF). The BWF World Tour is divided into levels of World Tour Finals, Super 1000, Super 750, Super 500, Super 300 (part of the HSBC World Tour), and the BWF Tour Super 100.

Men's doubles

BWF Superseries (11 titles, 2 runners-up) 
The BWF Superseries, which was launched on 14 December 2006 and implemented in 2007, was a series of elite badminton tournaments, sanctioned by the Badminton World Federation (BWF). BWF Superseries levels were Superseries and Superseries Premier. A season of Superseries consisted of twelve tournaments around the world that had been introduced since 2011. Successful players were invited to the Superseries Finals, which were held at the end of each year.

Men's doubles

 BWF World Superseries Finals tournament
 BWF Superseries Premier tournament
 BWF Superseries tournament

BWF Grand Prix (3 titles, 1 runner-up) 
The BWF Grand Prix had two levels, the Grand Prix and Grand Prix Gold. It was a series of badminton tournaments sanctioned by the Badminton World Federation (BWF) and played between 2007 and 2017.

Men's doubles

 BWF Grand Prix Gold tournament
 BWF Grand Prix tournament

BWF International Challenge/Series (3 titles, 3 runners-up) 
Men's singles

Men's doubles

Mixed doubles

 BWF International Challenge tournament
 BWF International Series tournament
 BWF Future Series tournament

BWF Junior International (1 runner-up) 
Boys' doubles

  BWF Junior International Grand Prix tournament
  BWF Junior International Challenge tournament
  BWF Junior International Series tournament
  BWF Junior Future Series tournament

Performance timeline

National team 
 Senior level

Individual competitions

Senior level

Men's doubles

Mixed doubles

Record against selected opponents 
Record against year-end Finals finalists, World Championships semi-finalists, and Olympic quarter-finalists.

Kevin Sanjaya Sukamuljo 
Marcus Fernaldi Gideon and Kevin Sanjaya Sukamuljo have ten winning streaks in the head-to-head record against Takuro Hoki and Yugo Kobayashi. They also lead the meeting record with a wide margin against Li Junhui and Liu Yuchen of China and their senior compatriots Mohammad Ahsan and Hendra Setiawan. Meanwhile, Sukamuljo and Gideon have a poor head-to-head record against Hiroyuki Endo and Yuta Watanabe (2–6), Lee Yong-dae and Yoo Yeon-seong (0–3), and also Fu Haifeng and Zhang Nan (1–3).

Markis Kido

References

External links 

 

1991 births
Living people
Sportspeople from Jakarta
Indonesian male badminton players
Badminton players at the 2020 Summer Olympics
Olympic badminton players of Indonesia
Badminton players at the 2018 Asian Games
Asian Games gold medalists for Indonesia
Asian Games silver medalists for Indonesia
Asian Games medalists in badminton
Medalists at the 2018 Asian Games
Competitors at the 2015 Southeast Asian Games
Southeast Asian Games gold medalists for Indonesia
Southeast Asian Games silver medalists for Indonesia
Southeast Asian Games medalists in badminton
World No. 1 badminton players
BWF Best Male Player of the Year